Goeppertia rufibarba (syn. Calathea rufibarba), the furry feather or velvet calathea, is a flowering plant in the Marantaceae family, native to Bahia state of northeastern Brazil. The plant's common names are due to its fuzzy, fur-like underleaf texture, which is unusual in its genus. Common as a houseplant, the species requires warm temperatures, shade, and humidity to thrive, and may produce small yellow flowers. It has gained the Royal Horticultural Society's Award of Garden Merit.

References 

rufibarba
Endemic flora of Brazil
Flora of Bahia
House plants
Taxa named by Eduard Fenzl
Plants described in 1879